Philip (Phil)  C. Bevilacqua is a biological chemist. He was born on September 7, 1965, in North Collins, NY. He currently serves as a distinguished professor at the Pennsylvania State University in State College, PA.  In  2009, he was elected a  Fellow of the American Association for Advancement of Science (AAAS)

Education 
 B.S., John Carroll University, 1987
 Ph.D., University of Rochester, 1993
 Postdoctoral Fellow, University of Colorado, Boulder, 1993–97

Academic work 
After being mentored by Tom Cech, Bevilacqua became interested in the folding of RNA and its interactions with chemistry. His research  looks at how RNA affects biological processes. He studies viral replication in humans and the responses to abiotic stresses in plants. Some approaches that his lab uses are rapid mixing kinetics, fluorescence spectroscopy, UV melting, site-directed mutagenesis, combinatorial selection of RNA (or SELEX), Raman spectroscopy, NMR, SAXS, and X-ray crystallography.

References 

1965 births
Living people
21st-century American chemists
Fellows of the American Association for the Advancement of Science